In relational databases, a condition (or predicate) in a query is said to be sargable if the DBMS engine can take advantage of an index to speed up the execution of the query. The term is derived from a contraction of Search ARGument ABLE. It was first used by IBM researchers as a contraction of Search ARGument, and has come to mean simply "can be looked up by an index."

A query failing to be sargable is known as a non-sargable query and typically has a negative effect on query time, so one of the steps in query optimization is to convert them to be sargable.  The effect is similar to searching for a specific term in a book that has no index, beginning at page one each time, instead of jumping to a list of specific pages identified in an index.

The typical situation that will make a SQL query non-sargable is to include in the WHERE clause a function operating on a column value.  The WHERE clause is not the only clause where sargability can matter; it can also have an effect on ORDER BY, GROUP BY and HAVING clauses.  The SELECT clause, on the other hand, can contain non-sargable expressions without adversely affecting the performance.

Some database management systems, for instance PostgreSQL, support functional indices. Conceptually, an index is simply a mapping between a value and one or more locations. With a functional index, the value stored in the index is the output of the function specified when the index is created. This capability expands what is sargable beyond base column expressions.

 Sargable operators: 
 Sargable operators that rarely improve performance:

Simple example
 clauses that are sargable typically have field values on the left of the operator, and scalar values or expressions on the right side of the operator.

Not sargable:

SELECT *
FROM   myTable
WHERE  SQRT(myIntField) > 11.7 

This is not sargable because myIntField is embedded in a function. If any indexes were available on myIntField, they could not be used. In addition,  would be called on every record in myTable.

Sargable version:

SELECT *
FROM   myTable
WHERE  myIntField > 11.7 * 11.7

This is sargable because myIntField is NOT contained in a function, making any available indexes on myIntField potentially usable. Furthermore, the expression is evaluated only once, rather than for each record in the table.

Text example

Not sargable:

SELECT *
FROM   myTable
WHERE  myNameField LIKE '%Wales%' -- Begins with %, not sargable  

This is not sargable. It must examine every row to find the fields containing the substring  in any position.

Sargable version:

SELECT *
FROM   myTable
WHERE  myNameField LIKE 'Jimmy%' -- Does not begin with %, sargable  

This is sargable. It can use an index to find all the myNameField values that start with the substring  .

See also 
 Block Range Index
 Query optimization

Notes 
 Gulutzan and Pelzer, (Chapter 2, Simple "Searches")

References 
 SQL Performance Tuning by Peter Gulutzan, Trudy Pelzer (Addison Wesley, 2002)  (Chapter 2, Simple "Searches")
 Microsoft SQL Server 2012 Internals by Kalen Delaney, Connor Cunningham, Jonathan Kehayias, Benjamin Nevarez, Paul S. Randal (O'Reily, 2013)  (Chapter 11, The Query Optimizer)

External links 

 SQL Shack - How to use sargable expressions in T-SQL queries; performance advantages and examples
 DBA.StackExchange.com - What does the word “SARGable” really mean?

Database management systems
Relational model